Chesley Gray (January 9, 1914 – April 18, 1996), nicknamed "Chester", was an American Negro league catcher in the 1940s.

A native of Union City, Tennessee, Gray made his Negro leagues debut in 1940 with the St. Louis–New Orleans Stars. He went on to play for the New York Black Yankees, and finished his career with the Kansas City Monarchs in 1945, where he played alongside Baseball Hall of Famer Jackie Robinson. Gray died in Ann Arbor, Michigan in 1996 at age 82.

References

External links
 and Seamheads
 Chester Gray at Negro League Baseball Players Association

1914 births
1996 deaths
Kansas City Monarchs players
St. Louis–New Orleans Stars players
New York Black Yankees players
Baseball catchers
Baseball players from Tennessee
People from Union City, Tennessee
20th-century African-American sportspeople